The World Taekwondo Championship is held every two years by World Taekwondo.

Competitions

1 Wuxi, China, was originally selected to host the 2021 World Taekwondo Championships. Due to the impact of the Global COVID-19 pandemic, Wuxi gave up hosting the World Taekwondo Championship. In Early 2022, Guadalajara, Mexico was selected as a replacement host.

All-time medal table
All-time medal count as 2022 World Taekwondo Championships:

Multiple gold medalists
The table shows those who have won at least three gold medals.

Men

Women

See also
 World Cup Taekwondo Team Championships
 World Taekwondo Junior Championships

References

External links
World Taekwondo Federation

 
Taekwondo competitions
Taekwondo
Recurring sporting events established in 1973
Biennial sporting events